Kerstin Kristina Birgitta "Kim" Anderzon (20 March 1943 – 24 October 2014) was a Swedish actress active in film and theatre.

Early life and career
At the age of sixteen, Anderzon moved to Stockholm, where she pursued an education as a cartographer, with which she worked for a while before her acting career took over. She started taking acting classes at Inge Wærns teaterstudio. In 1969, she started acting at Pistolteatern. In the same year she made her stage debut in the play Direktör Ubu. She later had roles in the plays Åh, vad revolutionen är härlig!!... (1974), Vi betalar inte! Vi betalar inte! (1977), and En kvinna (1979). She won the award for Best Actress at the 19th Guldbagge Awards for her role in Second Dance. Along with Tomas Bolme, she co-hosted the 27th Guldbagge Awards.

Personal life
Anderzon has two children, actress Anna Catharina Tintin Anderzon, and Andrej Anderzon Möller.

Anderzon died of spinal cancer in her home on 24 October 2014.

Partial filmography

Miss and Mrs Sweden (1969)
The Indelicate Balance (1969) - Karin / Harald's wife
Kyrkoherden (1970) - Agneta
Midsommardansen (1971) - Raija
Badjävlar (1971, TV Movie) - The Model
 En enkel melodi (1974) - Assistant
Elvis! Elvis! (1976) - Anna-Rosa's Mother
Sällskapsresan (1980) - Siv Åman
Göta kanal eller Vem drog ur proppen? (1981) - Lena
Sally och friheten (1981) - Inger
Göta kanal eller Vem drog ur proppen? (1981) - Lena
Skål och välkommen (1981) - Eva
Klippet (1982) - Margit
Gräsänklingar (1982) - Hypnosdamen
Andra dansen (1983) - Anna
Raskenstam (1983) - Defense Attorney
Sköna juveler (1984) - Veronika
Vägen till Gyllenblå! (1985, TV Mini-Series) - Kubina
Min pappa är Tarzan (1986) - Sonja
Ingen kan älska som vi (1988) - Boarding-house supervisor
Ha ett underbart liv (1992) - Eva
Blackjack (1990) - Woman at Balders Hage (uncredited)
Rederiet (1994–2002, TV Series) - Siv Svensson
Stannar du så springer jag (1995) - Anna Hallonlöv
Cluedo - en mordgåta (1996, TV Series) - Linda Hamilton-Gullin
Längtans blåa blomma (1998, TV Mini-Series) - Midwife
Julens hjältar (1999, TV Series) - Julstjärnan
Kärlekens språk (2004) - Emilia / Morfar's girlfriend
Aphelium (2005)
Göta kanal 2 – Kanalkampen (2006) - Lena
Leende guldbruna ögon (2007, TV Mini-Series) - Eva
Mera ur kärlekens språk (2009)
Den Sista Dokusåpan (2012, TV Series) - Abbes Farmor

References

Further reading

External links

1943 births
2014 deaths
Swedish film actresses
Litteris et Artibus recipients
Swedish stage actresses
Best Actress Guldbagge Award winners
People from Östersund
Deaths from spinal cancer
Neurological disease deaths in Sweden
Deaths from cancer in Sweden